Bruce Kay is an American set decorator. He was nominated for an Academy Award in the category Best Art Direction for the film The Brink's Job. Kay also won a Primetime Emmy Award in the category Outstanding Art Direction for his work on the television program The Duck Factory.

Selected filmography 
 The Brink's Job (1978; co-nominated with Dean Tavoularis, Angelo P. Graham and George R. Nelson)

References

External links 

Possibly living people
Place of birth missing (living people)
Year of birth missing (living people)
American set decorators
Primetime Emmy Award winners